The 1907 German football championship was the fifth season in which teams competed for the national championship title. Six teams qualified to reach the final stages of the competition, and the winners were Freiburger FC, defeating  Viktoria 89 Berlin 3–1 in the final.

For Freiburger FC it was the sole appearance in the German championship final. Viktoria 89 Berlin made its first of four final appearances in 1907, going on to win the 1908 and 1911 championships as well as losing the 1909 final in between.

Viktoria's Helmut Röpnack and Freiburg's Phillip Burkart were the top scorers of the 1907 championship with four goals each.

Six clubs qualified for the competition played in knock-out format, the champions of each of the six regional football championships.

Qualified teams
The teams qualified through the regional championships:

Competition

Quarter-finals
The preliminary round, played on 21 April 1907:

|}

Semi-finals

Final

References

Sources
 kicker Allmanach 1990, by kicker, page 160 to 178 – German championship
 Süddeutschlands Fussballgeschichte in Tabellenform 1897-1988  History of Southern German football in tables, publisher & author: Ludolf Hyll

External links
 German Championship 1906–07 at weltfussball.de 
 German Championship 1907 at RSSSF

German football championship seasons
1
German